There are five members in the English-Irish boy band the Wanted: Max George, Jay McGuiness, Tom Parker and Nathan Sykes who are from England, and Siva Kaneswaran who is from Ireland.

Below are profiles of the group, in alphabetical order by last name.

Max George

Maximillian Alberto "Max" George (born ) grew up with his family in Manchester. Before music, he was a footballer with Preston North End and was on the verge of signing a two-year deal with them. He has been a Manchester City F.C. supporter since a young age. He was previously a member of Avenue, a five-piece boy band made up of himself, Jonathan Lloyd, Scott Clarke, Ross Candy and Jamie Tinkler. They entered the third series of The X Factor in 2006 and made it to Louis Walsh's bootcamp, but media reports exposed that Avenue had not strictly adhered to the rules, having been signed by an earlier X Factor music director to a deal. They were banned from participation for having professional representation rather than being specifically formed for the competition. Avenue admitted they had failed to duly report their engagements and George admitted it was "not The X Factors fault" in the video showing their disqualification in Walsh's office. With Andy Brown joining as a member of Avenue replacing Jamie Tinkler, the band went on to have some success beyond their X Factor appearances with their debut single "Last Goodbye", reaching number 50 on the UK Singles Chart. They had a follow up release with "Can You Feel It?." Avenue disbanded in April 2009. In 2008, while still a member of Avenue, George appeared naked on cover of British gay magazine AXM "Naked Issue" in support of cancer research.

George was engaged to actress Michelle Keegan after meeting her at one of the Wanted's concerts, but said in April 2012 that the engagement had been broken off. In October 2013, George confirmed in an interview that he was dating Danish swimwear model Nina Agdal. They split in February 2014. He also dated beauty queen Amy Willerton briefly in 2014.

In January 2014, George signed with Creative Artists Agency in Los Angeles to help him break into acting. He also announced that he has been signed by manager Scooter Braun as a solo artist. As of June 2014, George has enrolled himself into an elocution class.

In 2015, George landed his first acting role in Sixth Season of the popular television show Glee as Clint, a bully and the lead vocalist of Vocal Adrenaline. He also appeared on Bear Grylls: Mission Survive on ITV.

Siva Kaneswaran

Siva Michael Kaneswaran (born ) grew up in Corduff Blanchardstown, Dublin with his Sri Lankan Tamil father, Irish mother, twin brother Kumar, and six other siblings. Kaneswaran started modelling at 16 and appeared in various ads and landed a contract with Storm Model Management. Kaneswaran took part in Rock Rivals, televised in eight episodes between 17 March and 23 April 2008. His brother took part as well. Kaneswaran played the role of Carson Coombs and his brother that of Caleb Coombs. The brothers also appeared briefly in one episode of Uncle Max. The episode "Uncle Max Plays Tennis" aired on 11 July 2008. Kaneswaran was spotted through his modelling campaigns and subsequently recruited for the band. He is the younger brother of former Dove member and former Popstars: The Rivals contestant Hazel Kaneswaran.

In 2009, Siva was selected from thousands of auditions to be a member of the Wanted. Originally managed by Jayne Collins and signed to Geffen Island Mercury.
They were then signed worldwide to Universal Music subsidiaries Island Records and Mercury Records, and managed by Scooter Braun.

When Siva signed with Storm Model Management in the UK, he soon began acting in Rock Rivals & Uncle Max. In 2015, Kaneswaran signed with Agency for the Performing Arts and Untitled Management.

Jay McGuiness
James "Jay" McGuiness (born 24 July 1990 (age 31)) grew up in Newark, Nottingamshire, England. He has a fraternal twin brother and three other siblings.

McGuiness is a vegetarian and was named PETA's Sexiest Male Vegetarian in 2013.

He graduated from the Midlands Academy of Dance and Drama and learned about the Wanted when he randomly searched "auditions" in Google; he got two results back, one for a circus and one for a new band (he chose the band).

Jay competed in, and went on to win Strictly Come Dancings 2015 season. He was partnered with professional Aliona Vilani. In December 2015, he was awarded the glitterball trophy as the champion of the season. He Joined the Strictly Come Dancing UK tour the following year.

Theatre

In 2018 he made his West End debut in Big The Musical at the Dominion Theatre, a musical remake of the 1988 film Big starring Tom Hanks. He played Josh Baskin, the character made famous by Hanks, and co starred with Kimberley Walsh, Matthew Kelly, and Wendi Peters.

In 2019 he performed in Rip it Up at the Garrick Theatre, a 60s musical, alongside fellow Strictly alumni Aston MerryGold, Harry Judd and Louis Smith.

In 2020 Jay Starred in Sleepless, the musical adaptation of the 1993 movie Sleepless in Seattle, at the Wembley Park Troubadour Theatre. Reuniting with his Big co-star Kimberley Walsh, also featuring Harriet Thorpe and Corey English.

Tom Parker

Thomas Anthony Parker (1988–2022) grew up in Bolton. Parker learned to play the guitar at the age of sixteen after trying out his older brother's. He then went on to audition for The X Factor but did not get past the first round. He went to Manchester Metropolitan University and studied geography, but dropped out in pursuit of a professional singing career. Parker joined a Take That tribute band known as Take That II and toured Northern England, before joining the Wanted in 2009.

He had been dating his actress girlfriend Kelsey Hardwick since 2009, they got engaged at Chewton Glen on 16 March 2016. Parker was also an avid DJ, and collaborated with Richard Rawson on a track called "Fireflies", which was released in August 2014. In May 2015, Parker was confirmed to take part in the UK version of Celebrity Masterchef. He was then eliminated during the semi-finals of the competition. Parker had been working on his own music. In October 2015, he released "Undiscovered" along with his own website and tour dates. In February 2016 it was confirmed that he was to replace Tina Hobley on the Channel 4 show The Jump after she fell on her arm and dislocated her elbow and finished 3rd.

On 30 March 2022 it was announced that he had died as a result of brain cancer. Following his death, his memoir Hope: My Inspirational Life was published on the 26th of May. It quickly became a Sunday Times Bestseller

Nathan Sykes

Nathan James Sykes (born ) is the youngest member of the group. He grew up in Abbeydale, Gloucester with his mother, who is a music teacher and younger sister Jessica. He started singing and performing at the age of six and attended the prestigious Sylvia Young Theatre School from the age of 11. After completing his GCSEs and graduating from Sylvia Young, he returned to Gloucester to attend sixth form at the selective Ribston Hall High School; however he did not complete his A-levels due to band commitments.

Sykes frequently performed as a child singer, winning various competitions including "Britney Spears's Karaoke Kriminals" in 2003, in which he got to kiss Britney Spears on live TV as part of his prize, and the Cheltenham Competitive Festival of Dramatic Art, also in 2003. He appeared on ITV's Ministry of Mayhem in 2004, and won the Door Youth Project's Undiscovered Youth Talent Contest held in Derker, performing "Mack the Knife". He also performed for the Live and Unsigned Music Competition in Bristol in 2008. Sykes attempted to represent the UK in the Junior Eurovision Song Contest 2004 held in Lillehammer, Norway. In the British qualifying finals, he sang "Born to Dance" coming 3rd overall, after winner Cory Spedding and runner-up Andrew Merry.

In April 2013, it was announced that after being on voice rest for almost a month, Sykes would have to undergo specialist throat surgery in Los Angeles, California on his 20th birthday. His exact condition was not reported; however, several tabloids addressed the situation saying Sykes was suffering from a vocal cord hemorrhage. The band announced that they would continue their promotional commitments without Sykes for the time being in order to allow him to recover from the surgery. It was confirmed that Sykes' break would be temporary and he would join the rest of the band later in 2013 when his voice recovered, however, the length of the healing process was unknown.

Sykes made his return in June 2013 when the Wanted opened the Capital FM Summertime Ball, during a performance of "I Found You". Following his return to the band, Sykes confirmed that he would be joining the rest of his bandmates for their upcoming summer gigs and events, while also stating that he still has some recovering to do. Speaking with Heart Radio for an interview, Sykes told the audience: "I'm not quite fully recovered yet but it's quite a long process. I'm at the stage where I can sing and get back with the lads, so I'm very excited to be back and I'm working very hard for a change." As part of the recovery process, it has been reported that Sykes still has to undergo speech and vocal therapy in order to sing with his full vocal range without causing any more damage to it.

On 21 June 2014, Sykes appeared solo as a special guest performer at the Capital FM Summertime Ball alongside Jessie J to perform "Calling All Hearts" with DJ Cassidy. This marked his first official solo performance since the band's hiatus and his fifth consecutive year as part of the Summertime Ball lineup. He is currently working on music for his debut solo album. Sykes plans to release his debut single in spring 2015, with his debut album being released towards the end of the year.

On 28 January 2015 MTV revealed that Sykes had played them previews of his upcoming material co-written with producers Harmony and LDN Noise including "Money", "Famous" and "Kiss Me Quick".

On 5 March 2015, Sykes released a free track named "More Than You'll Ever Know". The video of "More Than You'll Ever Know" was released on 12 March 2015. On 10 March 2015, Sykes announced to his fans via social media that he would be embarking on a 6 night "intimate" UK tour.

On the 9th of April, Nathan told fans on social media that "Kiss Me Quick", a song he co-wrote with LDN Noise and Ali Tennant, will be the first single. "Kiss Me Quick" charted well. The song peaked to number 14 on the UK Singles Chart and number 19 on the Scottish Singles Chart. The song also reached the number 1 spot on the US Dance Club Songs chart.

References

Wanted members
Wanted